Euriphellus euribates is a species of butterfly in the family Hesperiidae.

Description
The wingspan is 28–30 mm. The forewings are tawny brown, with three large yellow-orange discal partially translucent macules and two to three translucent subapical macules of the same colour. The hindwings have a small area of shiny scales. Adults are crepuscular.

Distribution and habitat
Euriphellus euribates is found from Costa Rica southwards to Bolivia and southern Brazil.

References

Eudaminae